The Earhart Expressway, named for former New Orleans Commissioner of Public Utilities, Fred A. Earhart, is a state highway located in both Jefferson Parish and Orleans Parish, Louisiana. Although it is an odd-numbered highway and is bannered north/south, it travels in a more east-to-west direction.

Route description
From the south (east), LA 3139 begins at the intersection of Earhart Boulevard and Monroe Street in New Orleans.  The expressway designation begins several blocks later as Earhart Boulevard transitions into a limited-access freeway after crossing Hamilton Street.  Earhart Expressway proceeds westward and passes over Hoey's Canal and the Canadian National Railway (CN) as it crosses from Orleans Parish into Jefferson Parish.  A partial interchange at Deckbar Avenue provides access to U.S. 90 (Jefferson Highway).  Continuing westward along the southern boundary of Metairie, the expressway passes underneath Causeway Boulevard (LA 3046) and crosses over the Norfolk Southern Railway (NS).  A second partial interchange is encountered at Cleary Avenue, providing access to U.S. 61 (Airline Drive), after which the expressway again crosses over the CN railroad tracks as well as Central Avenue.  The only full interchange along the route occurs at (South) Clearview Parkway (LA 3152), a north-south thoroughfare which connects the Huey P. Long Bridge with U.S. 61 and I-10.  From this interchange, the expressway proceeds westward to a terminus at Dickory Avenue (LA 3154) near Harahan.

The majority of the expressway carries three lanes in each direction, narrowing to two lanes at either end.  The posted speed limit is 50 mph (80 km/h), and there is no paved shoulder along the route.  Excepting the full interchange at Clearview Parkway, exits only occur from the westbound lanes, and marked on-ramps only serve the eastbound direction.  (An unmarked on-ramp enters the westbound lanes from L&A Road behind the Kansas City Southern railroad yard).  Earhart Expressway is used as a relatively uncongested route for commuters, as well as an alternate to I-10 or Airline Drive to reach Louis Armstrong New Orleans International Airport.

Earhart Boulevard
The Earhart Expressway is an extension of Earhart Boulevard, a divided four- and six-lane thoroughfare that begins at Loyola Avenue near the New Orleans Union Passenger Terminal.

Major intersections

References

External links

La DOTD State, District, and Parish Maps
District 02
Orleans Parish
Jefferson Parish (North Section)

3139
Streets in New Orleans
Roads in Louisiana
Freeways in the United States
Transportation in Jefferson Parish, Louisiana
1971 establishments in Louisiana